John Hogg (7 October 1931 – 2001) was an English footballer who played as a winger.

Hogg started his career with Sunderland in 1949 before moving to local non-league side Blyth Spartans without having made an appearance. In 1954, Hogg signed for Portsmouth. Then once again, without making an appearance, Hogg moved into non-league football. This time with Peterborough United. Hogg finally made his Football League debut in 1957 when he signed for Gateshead. He went on to make 80 appearances for the Tynesiders, scoring 21 goals. Hogg moved back to Blyth Spartans after Gateshead were voted out of the league in favour of Peterborough United in 1960.

Sources

1931 births
2001 deaths
English footballers
Association football wingers
Sunderland A.F.C. players
Blyth Spartans A.F.C. players
Portsmouth F.C. players
Peterborough United F.C. players
Gateshead A.F.C. players
English Football League players